Hunchy is a locality in the Sunshine Coast, Queensland, Australia.

Geography 
Hunchy is in the foothills of the Blackall Range and was first called Hunchback.

There is farming within the area with crops such as pineapples, lychees, macadamias, mangoes, bananas, citrus, avocados and a small quantity of coffee beans grown. Some of the older settlers trialled Shiraz grapes in the region but it did not rate in James Halliday's Wine Companions.  Livestock include cattle, alpacas and honey-bees.

History 
Hunchy State School opened on 18 August 1924. It closed on 31 December 1969. It was at 53-61 Hunchy School Road.

At the 2011 Australian Census the suburb recorded a population of 524.

References

Suburbs of the Sunshine Coast Region
Localities in Queensland